Thliptoceras semicirculare is a moth in the family Crambidae. It was described by Zhang in 2014. It is found in Guangdong, China.

The wingspan is about 23–28 mm. The forewings are greyish yellow, with scattered yellowish-brown scales. The hindwings are greyish yellow with scattered with orange scales.

Etymology
The species name refers to the dorsal valva margin with a semicircular excavation near the apex and is derived from Latin semicircularis (meaning semicircular).

References

Moths described in 2014
Pyraustinae